The Galapagos Rise is a divergent boundary located between the South American coast and the triple junction of the Nazca Plate, the Cocos Plate, and the Pacific Plate.  The volcanically active Galapagos Islands exist on the Galápagos hotspot above the Galapagos Rise. The Galapagos Microplate is a small separate plate on the rise just to the southeast of the triple junction. 

The Cocos Ridge trends northeasterly from the Galapagos to the coast of Costa Rica and Panama. The Carnegie Ridge trends almost due east to the Ecuadorian coast.

The Galapagos Rise is a currently active ridge. Fernandina Volcano on Fernandina Island, the most westerly island of the chain erupted on May 12, 2005 ejecting a column of ash that rose to a height of seven km from a fissure on the west side of the volcano. Volcanic ash fell on neighboring Isabela Island. Alcedo Volcano on Isabela Island last erupted in the 1950s.

References
Galapagos geology - Cornell - map of the Rise
Nasa Earth Observatory - View of Fernandina Volcano from space

Underwater ridges of the Pacific Ocean